Events in the year 1125 in Norway.

Incumbents
Monarch - Sigurd I Magnusson

Events

1125 is regarded as the founding year of the city of Stavanger, with the establishing of the Diocese of Stavanger, and construction of the Stavanger Cathedral is initiated.

Arts and literature

Births

Deaths

References

Norway